Ned Kick (12 October 1904 – 24 February 1991) was a former Australian rules footballer who played with Carlton and Fitzroy in the Victorian Football League (VFL).

Notes

External links 

Ned Kick's profile at Blueseum

1904 births
1991 deaths
Carlton Football Club players
Fitzroy Football Club players
Australian rules footballers from Victoria (Australia)